The Balance Rock Inn is a boutique hotel in the American town of Bar Harbor, Maine. AAA Four Diamond-rated, the structure was built in 1903 as a home for Scottish railroad tycoon Alexander Maitland. Maitland was Henry Flagler's partner in the Florida East Coast Railway."Tycoon For A Night"  – Portland Monthly, July/August 2014 The hotel is named for Balance Rock, a nearby geological formation that balances on a slender stone fulcrum just off Bar Harbor's Shore Path.

The hotel, which was expanded to 27 rooms in 1995, is constructed in the shingle style and was designed by the noted architectural firm Andrews, Jaques & Rantoul. Its restaurant is called The Veranda.

Situated at the eastern end of Albert Meadow, a cul-de-sac off Bar Harbor's Main Street, the hotel stands adjacent to Grant Park and overlooks Frenchman Bay and its Porcupine Islands.

Gallery

References

External links

Balance Rock Inn – American Automobile Association

Buildings and structures in Bar Harbor, Maine
Hotels in Bar Harbor, Maine
Hotels established in the 1980s
1903 establishments